Bloomfield is a suburb of Hartford in Hartford County, Connecticut, United States. The town's population was 21,535 at the 2020 census. Bloomfield is best known as the headquarters of healthcare services company Cigna.

History 
Originally land of the Poquonock Native Americans, the area was first settled in 1660 as part of Windsor, organized as the Parish of Wintonbury in 1736. Wintonbury comes from three names from neighboring towns Windsor, Farmington, and Simsbury. It was finally incorporated as the town of Bloomfield by the Connecticut General Assembly on May 28, 1835. Initially, the town's local economy was agriculturally based, mostly in shade tobacco, remaining as such until it developed as a postwar suburb of Hartford starting in the 1950s. Today, Bloomfield's local character varies. While the town's southern and eastern fringes are more densely populated and developed, the northern and western sections maintain a more rural feel with meadows, woods, and some remaining farmland.

Geography 

Bloomfield is bordered by Windsor to the northeast, East Granby to the north, Simsbury and Avon to the west, and West Hartford and Hartford to the south.

The northern border of Bloomfield is formed by the Farmington River. The west side of the town is flanked by Talcott Mountain, part of the Metacomet Ridge, a mountainous trap rock ridgeline that stretches from Long Island Sound to nearly the Vermont border. Notable features of the Metacomet Ridge in Bloomfield include Penwood State Park and the Tariffville Gorge of the Farmington River, on the borders of East Granby, Simsbury, and Bloomfield. The  Metacomet Trail traverses the ridge.

Transportation
The major east–west throughway in Bloomfield is Route 218, which starts at the Simsbury Road/Hall Boulevard split at the West Hartford line and inches north toward Cottage Grove Road before heading eastbound. Bloomfield also has two major north–south highways: Blue Hills Avenue (Route 187) and Bloomfield/Tunxis Avenues (Route 189). These highways merge when approaching the Windsor line but before returning to Bloomfield.

Eleven bus routes in Connecticut Transit's Hartford Division serve Bloomfield: 36, 46, 50, 52, 54, 56, 72, 74, 76, 92, and 153.

Demographics

2020 census

Note: the US Census treats Hispanic/Latino as an ethnic category. This table excludes Latinos from the racial categories and assigns them to a separate category. Hispanics/Latinos can be of any race.

2000 Census
As of the census of 2010, there were 20,486 people, 8,554 households, and 5,343 families residing in the town. The racial makeup of the town was 35.7% White, 57.5% African American, 0.03% Native American, 1.9% Asian, 0.01% Pacific Islander, 1.70% from other races, and 3% from two or more races. Hispanic or Latino of any race were 5.6% of the population.

There were 8,554 households, out of which 19.3% had children under the age of 18 living with them, 41.8% were married couples living together, 16.9% had a female householder with no husband present, and 37.5% were non-families. 31.9% of all households were made up of individuals, and 17.0% had someone living alone who was 65 years of age or older. The average household size was 2.32 and the average family size was 2.94.

In the town, the population was spread out, with 21.4% under the age of 18, 5.8% from 18 to 24, 24.5% from 25 to 44, 26.6% from 45 to 64, and 21.7% who were 65 years of age or older. The median age was 47.9 years. For every 122 females there were 100 males. For every 130 females age 18 and over, there were 100 males.

The median income for a household in the town was $73,519, and the median income for a family was $84,735.

As of the census of 2000. Males had a median income of $42,860 versus $36,778 for females. The per capita income for the town was $28,843.

U.S. Census Bureau, 2010-2014 American Community Survey 5-Year Estimates, About 5.8% of families and 7.9% of the population were below the poverty line, including 7.2% of those under age 18 and 6.7% of those age 65 or over.

Government and politics

Bloomfield has a Town council government. The Town Council elects a Chair, who is designated as Mayor, two weeks after the election. Mayor Danielle Wong began her first term as Mayor in November 2022.

Economy

Top employers
According to Bloomfield's 2020 Comprehensive Annual Financial Report, the top employers in the town are:

Schools 

Bloomfield is home to three secondary schools: the public Bloomfield High School, the inter-district Global Experience Magnet School (serving grades 6–12), and the Metropolitan Learning Center, a CREC school serving grades 6–12.

Bloomfield Public Schools (Connecticut) also has:
Pre-K3–K The Wintonbury Early Childhood Magnet School
K–2 Laurel Elementary
3–4 Metacomet Elementary
5–6 Carmen Arace Intermediate
7–8 Carmen Arace Middle School

Notable people 

 Clarence H. Adams (1905–1987), commissioner of U.S. Securities and Exchange Commission and president of the Boston Celtics
 George Ansbro (1915–2011), radio announcer
 LeRoy Bailey Jr. (born 1946), pastor and author
 Edward C. Banfield, political scientist
 James G. Batterson (1823–1901), founder of Travelers Insurance Company
 Julia Brace (1807–1884), deaf/blind woman of 19th Century
 Lawrence Clay-Bey (born 1965), professional heavyweight boxer, born in town
 Marcus Cooper (born 1990), cornerback for Chicago Bears
 Joe D'Ambrosio (born 1953), sports broadcaster and play-by-play announcer
 Edgar Eno, state assemblyman for Wisconsin
 Oliver Filley (1806–1881), mayor of St. Louis from 1858 to 1861
 Dwight Freeney, NFL All-Pro defensive end for Indianapolis Colts, attended Bloomfield High School
 Bobby Gibson, educator and member of the Connecticut House of Representatives
 Edward H. Gillette (1840–1918), congressman for Iowa, born in town
 Jessica Hecht (born 1965), actress
 Jaimoe, drummer for Allman Brothers Band
 K.C. Jones (1932–2020), NBA Hall of Fame basketball player
 Charles Kaman (1919–2011), aeronautical engineer, businessman, inventor and philanthropist
 Ellie Kanner, film and television director and former casting director
 Joža Karas (1926–2008), musician and teacher who made public music composed by inmates of Theresienstadt concentration camp during World War II
 Noella Marcellino (born 1951), Benedictine nun who earned doctorate in microbiology from University of Connecticut
 Richard P. McBrien (1936-2015), Catholic theologian and author of landmark work 'Catholicism'.
 Lewis Rome (1933–2015), state senator representing Bloomfield (1971–1979); long-time resident
 Anika Noni Rose (born 1972), singer and actress, born in town
 Nykesha Sales (born 1976), WNBA basketball player, born in town
 Franz Schurmann (1926–2010), sociologist and historian
 Johann Smith (born 1987), soccer player
 Joseph M. Suggs Jr. (born 1940), politician, Bloomfield mayor, and Connecticut State Treasurer (1993–1995)
 James Thorpe (1915–2009), Princeton University professor and academic; lived his later years and died in town
 David Ushery (born 1967), television news anchor
 Douglas Wimbish (born 1956), bass player

On the National Register of Historic Places
 Connecticut General Life Insurance Company (Cigna) Headquarters
 Capt. Oliver Filley House
 Francis Gillette House
 Old Farm Schoolhouse
 Southwest District School

Places of interest 
 The New England Muscle Bicycle Museum, with 120 bicycles from the 1960s and 1970s, is open by appointment 
 The First Cathedral, the largest non-denominational church in New England

References

External links
Town of Bloomfield official website
Bloomfield Public Library

 
Towns in Hartford County, Connecticut
Towns in Connecticut
Greater Hartford